Shipton is a civil parish in Shropshire, England.  It contains nine listed buildings that are recorded in the National Heritage List for England.  Of these, one is listed at Grade I, the highest of the three grades, two are at Grade II*, the middle grade, and the others are at Grade II, the lowest grade.  The parish contains the village of Shipton and the surrounding area.  In the parish is Shipton Hall, a country house that is listed together with associated structures.  The other listed buildings are a church originating from the 12th century and houses, the earliest of which are timber framed, one with cruck construction.


Key

Buildings

References

Citations

Sources

Lists of buildings and structures in Shropshire